In social psychology, reciprocity is a social norm of responding to a positive action with another positive action, rewarding kind actions. As a social construct, reciprocity means that in response to friendly actions, people are frequently much nicer and much more cooperative than predicted by the self-interest model; conversely, in response to hostile actions they are frequently much more nasty and even brutal.

Reciprocity makes it possible to build continuing relationships and exchanges. Francis Fukuyama states that “If the institutions of democracy and capitalism are to work properly, they must coexist within certain premodern cultural habits that ensure their proper functioning” (p. 11). He goes on to say “Law, contract, and economic rationality and prosperity…. must as well be leavened with reciprocity, moral obligation, duty toward community, and trust…. The latter are not anachronisms in a modern society but rather the sine qua non of the latter’s success” (p. 11) According to the sociologist Alvin Gouldner (1960), this norm is nearly universal, and only a few members of society—the very young, the sick, or the old—are exempt from it.

Reciprocal actions differ from altruistic actions in that reciprocal actions only follow from others' initial actions, while altruism is the unconditional act of social gift-giving without any hope or expectation of future positive responses. Some distinguish between ideal altruism (giving with no expectation of future reward) and reciprocal altruism (giving with limited expectation or the potential for expectation of future reward). For more information on this idea, see altruism or altruism (ethics).

History 
Reciprocity dates as far back as the time of Hammurabi (c. 1792–1750 BC). Hammurabi's code, a collection of 282 laws and standards, lists crimes and their various punishments as well as guidelines for citizens' conduct. The code demanded the individual act in terms of the public interest. The "eye for an eye" principles in which the laws were written mirror the idea of direct reciprocity. For example, if a person caused the death of another person, the killer would be put to death:

Law #196: "If a man destroy the eye of another man, they shall destroy his eye. If one break a man's bone, they shall break his bone. If one destroy the eye of a freeman or break the bone of a freeman he shall pay one gold mina. If one destroy the eye of a man's slave or break a bone of a man's slave he shall pay one-half his price."

Reciprocity was also a cornerstone of ancient Greece. In Homeric Greece, citizens relied on reciprocity as a form of transaction as there was no formal system of government or trade. In Homer's Iliad, he illustrates several instances of reciprocal transactions in the form of gift giving. For example, in Book VI of the Iliad, Glaucus and Diomedes exchange armor when they discover that their grandfathers were friends. However, there were times when direct reciprocity was not possible, specifically in times of great need when a citizen had nothing to give for repayment. Thus, deferred reciprocity was also prevalent in Greek culture at this time. Deferred reciprocity refers to giving a person gifts or favors with the understanding that they will repay this favor at another time when the initial giver is in great need. This form of reciprocity was used extensively by travelers, particularly in the Odyssey. Odysseus often had to rely on the kindness of human strangers and other mythological creatures to secure resources along his journey.

In the classical Greek polis, large-scale projects such as construction of temples, building of warships and financing of choruses were carried out as gifts from individual donors. In Rome, wealthy elite were linked with their dependents in a cycle of reciprocal gift giving. As these examples suggest, reciprocity enjoyed a cultural prestige among ancient aristocracies for whom it was advantageous.

An adaptive mechanism 
Richard Leakey and Roger Lewin attribute the very nature of humans to reciprocity. They claim humans survived because our ancestors learned to share goods and services "in an honored network of obligation". Thus, the idea that humans are indebted to repay gifts and favors is a unique aspect of human culture. Cultural anthropologists support this idea in what they call the "web of indebtedness" where reciprocity is viewed as an adaptive mechanism to enhance survival. Within this approach, reciprocity creates an interdependent environment where labor is divided so that humans may be more efficient. For example, if one member of the group cares for the children while another member hunts for food for the group, each member has provided a service and received one in return. Each member can devote more time and attention to his or her allotted task and the whole group benefits. This meant that individuals could give away resources without actually giving them away. Through the rule of reciprocity, sophisticated systems of aid and trade were possible bringing immense benefits to the societies that utilized them. Given the benefits of reciprocity at the societal level, it is not surprising that the norm has persisted and dictates our present cognition and behavior.

The power of reciprocity 
Reciprocity is not only a strong determining factor of human behavior; it is a powerful method for gaining one's compliance with a request. The rule of reciprocity has the power to trigger feelings of indebtedness even when faced with an uninvited favor and irrespective of liking the person who executed the favor. In 1971, Dennis Regan tested the strength of these two aspects of reciprocity in a study where participants believed they were in an art appreciation experiment with a partner, Joe, who was really Regan's assistant. During the experiment, Joe would disappear and bring back a soft drink for the participant. After this phase of the experiment was over, Joe would ask the participant to buy raffle tickets from him. The more the participants liked Joe, the more likely they were to buy raffle tickets from him. However, when Joe had given them a soda and thus indebted them to reciprocate, it made no difference whether the participants liked Joe or not, the rule of reciprocity overpowered liking. Thus, individuals who we might not even like have the power to greatly increase our chances of doing them a favor simply by providing us with a small gift or favor prior to their request. Furthermore, we are obliged to receive these gifts and favors which reduces our ability to choose to whom we wish to be indebted.

In 1976, Phillip Kunz demonstrated the automatic nature of reciprocity in an experiment using Christmas cards. In this experiment, Kunz sent out holiday cards with pictures of his family and a brief note to a group of complete strangers. While he expected some reaction, holiday cards came pouring back to him from people who had never met nor heard of him and who expressed no desire to get to know him any better. The majority of these individuals who responded never inquired into Kunz's identity, they were merely responding to his initial gesture with a reciprocal action.

Politics is another area where the power of reciprocity is evident. While politicians often claim autonomy from the feelings of obligation associated with gifts and favors that influence everyone else, they are also susceptible. In the 2002 election, U.S. Congress Representatives who received the most money from special interest groups were over seven times more likely to vote in favor of the group that had contributed the most money to their campaigns.

Fehr and Gächter (2000) showed that, when acting within reciprocal frameworks, individuals are more likely to deviate from purely self-interested behavior than when acting in other social contexts. Magnanimity is often repaid with disproportionate amounts of kindness and cooperation, and treachery with disproportionate amounts of hostility and vengeance, which can significantly surpass amounts determined or predicted by conventional economic models of rational self-interest. Moreover, reciprocal tendencies are frequently observed in situations wherein transaction costs associated with specific reciprocal actions are high and present or future material rewards are not expected. Whether self-interested or reciprocal action dominates the aggregate outcome is particularly dependent on context; in markets or market-like scenarios characterized by competitiveness and incomplete contracts, reciprocity tends to win out over self-interest.

Positive and negative reciprocity 
Positive reciprocity occurs when an action committed by one individual that has a positive effect on someone else is returned with an action that has an approximately equal positive effect. For example, if someone takes care of another person's dog, the person who received this favor should then return this action with another favor such as with a small gift. However, the reciprocated action should be approximately equal to the first action in terms of positive value, otherwise this can result in an uncomfortable social situation. If someone takes care of another person's dog and that person returns the favor by buying that individual a car, the reciprocated gift is inappropriate because it does not equal the initial gesture. Individuals expect actions to be reciprocated by actions that are approximately equal in value.

One example of positive reciprocity is that waitresses who smile broadly receive more tips than waitresses who present a minimal smile. Also, free samples are not merely opportunities to taste a product but rather invitations to engage in the rule of reciprocity. Many people find it difficult to accept the free sample and walk away. Instead, they buy some of the product even when they did not find it that enjoyable.

Negative reciprocity occurs when an action that has a negative effect on someone is returned with an action that has an approximately equal negative effect. For example, if an individual commits a violent act against a person, it is expected that person would return with a similar act of violence. If, however, the reaction to the initial negative action is not approximately equal in negative value, this violates the norm of reciprocity and what is prescribed as allowable. Retaliatory aspects i.e. the aspects of trying to get back and cause harm, are known as negative reciprocity. This definition of negative reciprocity is distinct from the way negative reciprocity is defined in other domains. In cultural anthropology, negative reciprocity refers to an attempt to get something for nothing. It is often referred to as "bartering" or "haggling" (see reciprocity (cultural anthropology) for more information).

Reciprocal concessions 
There are more subtle ways of initiating the reciprocity rule than merely doing something nice for someone so you may expect something in return. One form of this more subtle form of reciprocity is the idea of reciprocal concessions in which the requester lowers his/her initial request, making the respondent more likely to agree to a second request. Under the rule of reciprocity, we are obligated to concede to someone who has made a concession to us. That is, if an individual starts off by requesting something large and you refuse, you feel obligated to consent to their smaller request even though you might not be interested in either of the things they are offering. Robert Cialdini illustrates an example of this phenomenon by telling a story of a boy who asks him to buy five-dollar circus tickets and, when Cialdini refuses, asks him to buy some one dollar chocolate bars. Cialdini feels obligated to return the favor and consents to buying some of the chocolate bars.

The rule of reciprocity operates in reciprocal concessions in two ways. First, an individual is pressured to reciprocate one concession for another by nature of the rule itself. Second, because the individual who initially concedes can expect to have the other person concede in return, this person is free to make the concession in the first place. If there were no social pressure to return the concession, an individual runs the risk of giving up something and getting nothing in return. Mutual concession is a procedure that can promote compromise in a group so that individuals can refocus their efforts toward achieving a common goal. Reciprocal concessions promote compromise in a group so that the initial and incompatible desires of individuals can be set aside for the benefit of social cooperation.

The door in the face technique 
The door in the face technique, otherwise known as the rejection-then-retreat technique, involves making an outrageous request that someone will almost certainly turn down, and then make the smaller request that was the favor of interest all along. If done skillfully, the second request is seen as a concession so compliance with the second request is obtained. However, one must proceed with caution when using this technique. If the first request is so big that it is seen as unreasonable, the door in the face technique proves useless as the concession made after is not perceived as genuine. The door in the face technique is not to be confused with the foot in the door technique where individuals getting a person to agree with a large request by first getting them to agree to a moderate request.

See also 
 Cooperation
 Generalized exchange
 Homo reciprocans
 Influence: Science and Practice
 Norm of reciprocity
 Prisoner's dilemma
 Reciprocal altruism
 Reciprocity (cultural anthropology)
 Reciprocity (international relations)
 Reciprocity (social and political philosophy)

References 

Community building
Interpersonal relationships
Social constructionism